The 1984 ECAC Metro men's basketball tournament (now known as the Northeast Conference men's basketball tournament) was held March 8–10. All three rounds of the tournament were played at McCann Field House in Poughkeepsie, New York. 

Long Island defeated two-time defending tournament champion  in the championship game, 87–81, to win the school's first ECAC Metro men's basketball tournament title. The Blackbirds earned the automatic bid to the 1984 NCAA Tournament.

Bracket

References

Northeast Conference men's basketball tournament
Tournament
ECAC Metro men's basketball tournament
ECAC Metro men's basketball tournament